Seán "Clárach" Mac Domhnaill (1691–1754) was an Irish language poet in the first half of the 18th century.

Early life
Seán Clárach Mac Dómhnaill was born in 1691 in Churchtown, County Cork and lived all of his adult life at Kiltoohig (Cill Tuathaigh), a townland in the Electoral Division of Rathluirc (Charleville, County Cork) in the Civil Parish of Ballyhay, within the Barony of Orrery and Kilmore. Little or nothing is reliably recorded about his youth or family, but it is known that, despite the Penal Laws in force in Ireland, he received a comprehensive education, either in the home or in a hedge school, but most likely in both.  He was proficient in Latin, Ancient Greek and English literature as well as in his native Irish language.

Career
MacDómhnaill was convenor of the "Maigue Poets" (refer to the basin of the River Maigue), a circle of 18th century Gaelic poets based in County Limerick and the adjacent borders of County Cork during the middle decades of the 1700s. Under his chairmanship, they sometimes met in the ancient ringfort of Lios Ollium, in Bruree. His own house near Rath Luirc Charleville was a frequent meeting place, as were the homes of the others in the group. In Croom, County Limerick, he frequented the tig táirne public house of Seán Ó Tuama, a good friend and another Maigue poet.  Nicknamed "Clárach" (one with a wide face), MacDómhnaill was highly respected by his peers, even though his output was insignificant. His fellow Munster poets gave him the title Príomh-Éigeas na Mumhan (Chief Poet of Munster). MacDómhnaill was unable to sustain a living entirely from poetry, as others did, but was obliged to supplement his income by farm labouring and teaching  from time to time. 

His song Mo Ghile Mear has been recorded by Sting with the Chieftains, Mary Black and sean-nós singer songwriter Sibéal.

Death
Mac Domhnaill died In 1754 and buried in Holy Cross Cemetery, Charleville in the centre of the graveyard, on the site of the medieval parish church.

Works
Mo Ghile Mear is Mac Domhnaill's best known work. It is a lament or caoineadh written after the defeat of the Bonnie Prince Charles at the Battle of Culloden, in 1746. The Irish poets had pinned their hopes on Charles, and his flight was a crushing blow to the long-suffering Gaels of both Ireland and Scotland. Their exasperation and despair is vividly portrayed in this poem. Like all other Gaelic poems of the time, Mo Ghile Mear would have been sung rather than recited; indeed, the melody is well-known today. This is the chorus:

In 1723, on the death of Philippe II, Duke of Orléans, Mac Domhnaill wrote a poem reproaching him for his indifference towards Ireland. His other works include: De Bharr na gCnoc and Gráinne Mhaol.

Poetic style
While not a true bardic poet like Dáibhí Ó Bruadair, MacDómhnaill adhered to the complex rhyming methodology of the bards. His language could be ornate but not as flowery as the Classical Irish of the bardic schools. By the 18th century, this cloyingly ornate language had been abandoned in favour of modern dialect. The highly embellished language fell into disuse after the strict bardic schools closed down and a literary standard became impossible to maintain evenly across the country.

See also

 Aogán Ó Rathaille
 Piaras Feiritéar
 Cathal Buí Mac Giolla Ghunna
 Peadar Ó Doirnín
 Séamas Dall Mac Cuarta
 Art Mac Cumhaigh
 Brian Mac Giolla Phádraig
 Eoghan Rua Ó Súilleabháin

References

Notes

Sources
 
 
 
 
 
 

1691 births
1754 deaths
Irish Catholic poets
18th-century Irish-language poets
Irish Jacobites
Jacobite poets
Jacobite propagandists
People from County Cork